Edmond Roche (1929 – 11 October 2004), known as Ned Roche, was an Irish Gaelic footballer who played for club sides Clonmel Commercials and Knocknagoshel and at inter-county level with the Tipperary and Kerry senior football teams.

Career

Roche first played Gaelic football at club level with Knocknagoshel before transferring to the Clonmel Commercials club. His performances with the latter resulted in a call-up to the Tipperary senior football team, however, he declared for the Kerry senior football team in advance of the 1953 Munster Championship. Roche won the first of four provincial championship medals that year before ending the season with an All-Ireland title after a defeat of Armagh in the final. After defeat by Meath in the 1954 All-Ireland final, he claimed a second winners' medal after lining out at full-back in Kerry's defeat of Dublin in the 1955 All-Ireland final.

Honours

Kerry
All-Ireland Senior Football Championship: 1955
Leinster Senior Football Championship: 1954, 1955, 1958

References

External link
Ned Roche profile at the Terrace Talk website

1929 births
2004 deaths
Clonmel Commercials Gaelic footballers
Tipperary inter-county Gaelic footballers
Kerry inter-county Gaelic footballers
Munster inter-provincial Gaelic footballers